On 18 December 2022, at least nine police officers were killed when a convoy hit a roadside bomb near Kirkuk, Iraq. The bombing was followed by a gun fight. One Islamic State militant was reported killed. The incident happened near the village of Chalal al-Matar. The Islamic State of Iraq and the Levant (ISIL or ISIS) have reportedly claimed that they carried out the attack on their Telegram channel. The attack comes as IS militants in recent weeks have been exploiting the volatile security situation in Kirkuk and nearby provinces.

References 

21st-century mass murder in Iraq
December 2022 events in Iraq
Mass murder in 2022
Terrorist incidents in Iraq in 2022
2022 murders in Iraq
ISIL terrorist incidents in Iraq